= Banjul Accord Group =

West African aviation association

Banjul Accord Group (BAG) is a regional cooperative association of seven West African states established for the sub-regional cooperation and collaboration in the development of safe and sustainable civil aviation systems in West Africa, in line with International Civil Aviation Organization (ICAO) standards and recommended practices. The group comprises Cape Verde, The Gambia, Ghana, Guinea, Liberia, Nigeria and Sierra Leone.

== History ==
The Banjul Accord Group was established in 2004 to harmonize civil aviation policies and strengthen safety oversight among its member states. Its Council of Ministers is composed of each member’s Minister of Transport or Aviation and meets regularly to adopt resolutions on funding, regulatory harmonization and regional air connectivity.

== Organization and agencies ==
The BAG oversees two specialized bodies:

- Banjul Accord Group Aviation Safety Oversight Organisation (BAGASOO), tasked with strengthening the safety oversight capabilities of member states through pooling of resources, training, audit and harmonization of regulatory practices.
- Banjul Accord Group Accident Investigation Agency (BAGAIA), an independent body which conducts investigations into aircraft accidents and serious incidents upon delegation by a state, free of charge in accordance with its founding statutes.
